Schwarzmann is a German surname. Notable people with the surname include:

Alfred Schwarzmann (1912–2000), German gymnast
Herman J. Schwarzmann (1846–1891), German-born American architect
Stefan Schwarzmann (born 1965), German drummer

See also
Schwarzman
Schwartzmann
Schwartzman
Shvartsman

German-language surnames